Martina Luptáková (born 15 November 1977 in Lučenec) is a Slovak former basketball player who competed in the 2000 Summer Olympics.

References

1977 births
Living people
Slovak women's basketball players
Olympic basketball players of Slovakia
Basketball players at the 2000 Summer Olympics
People from Lučenec
Sportspeople from the Banská Bystrica Region